"Girls" is a song by English rock band the 1975, released as a single from their self-titled debut. A music video for "Girls" was released on 23 October 2013 and the song was released on 11 November.

Music video
The official music video for "Girls" was released on 23 October 2013. It follows the video for "Sex", which changed the art style of the band's music videos that were originally monochrome. Rather than reverting to the black-and-white style, the band decided to continue making music videos in color. Speaking about the music video, lead singer and guitarist Matty Healy said:When we released our last video ['Sex'], people really reacted to the fact that it was in colour. There was a lot of conjecture and talk surrounding it – due to the fact that it was an unexpected stylistic change. It was brought to our attention that certain people thought we were 'conforming to a record company's wishes' along with other expected and unexpected clichés. Obviously this couldn't be further from the truth, we are lucky enough to be surrounded by a group of individuals whose mantra centres on facilitating our creative wishes, we found the whole idea of us being told what to do fascinating. The story of the band who suffer at the hands of a record label shortly after a delirious rise is a tale as old as time. So we kinda wanted to make a tongue-in-cheek video about it. Twinned with our love of '80s pop, its innocence, grandiosity and conceptual ideas in music videos – we wanted to make a video about a record label's attempt at enforced conformity. We got our mate Adam down to a studio in Los Angeles at the start of our USA tour, got four models and made a video about us not wanting to make a video.

Other versions
In 2017, musician Cameron Hurley, under the alias new.wav, released a cover version of "Girls" in style of Blink-182. This iteration attracted press from NME and Alternative Press, among others, and was shared on Twitter by both Healy and Blink's Mark Hoppus; Healy wrote, "I'm in love."

Track listing

Personnel
Adapted from liner notes.

The 1975
 Matthew Healy – vocals, guitar
 Adam Hann – guitar
 George Daniel – drums
 Ross MacDonald – bass guitar

Additional personnel
Mike Crossey – producer
Mike Spink – engineer
Robin Schmidt – mastering

Charts

Weekly charts

Year-end charts

Certifications

Release history

References

2013 singles
2013 songs
Songs written by Matthew Healy
The 1975 songs
Funk songs
Music videos directed by Adam Powell